Francesco Ferrari (died 1507) was a Roman Catholic prelate who served as Bishop of Modena (1502–1507).

On 20 July 1502, Francesco Ferrari was appointed during the papacy of Pope Alexander VI as Bishop of Modena.
He served as Bishop of Modena until his death in 1507.

References

External links and additional sources
 (for Chronology of Bishops) 
 (for Chronology of Bishops) 

16th-century Italian Roman Catholic bishops
Bishops appointed by Pope Alexander VI
1507 deaths